Jack, Johnny, or John Ball may refer to:

Clergymen
John Ball (priest) ( 1338 – 1381), English radical priest and leader of 1381 Peasants' Revolt
John Ball (minister) (1665–1745), English Presbyterian minister
John Ball (clergyman) (before 1760 – after 1795), African-American minister from Nova Scotia
John Ball (bishop) (1934–2016), British Anglican bishop

Performers
Johnny Ball (born 1938), English children's television presenter 
John Ball (musician) (born 1990), American Christian musician

Politicians
John Ball (16th-century MP) (1518–1556), English Member of Parliament (MP) for Norwich
John Ball (assemblyman) (1756–1838), American soldier and politician
John Thomas Ball (1815–1898), Irish barrister and politician, MP for Dublin University 1868–1875
John Ball (naturalist) (1818–1889), Irish naturalist and politician, MP for County Carlow 1857–1880
John Ball (pioneer) (1794–1884), American pioneer and state politician
John Ball (Drogheda MP), MP for Drogheda in the Irish House of Commons

Sportsmen
John Ball (golfer) (1861–1940), English amateur golfer; winner of The Open Championship 
Jack Ball (footballer, born 1900) (1900–1989), English footballer for Bury and England
Jack Ball (footballer, born 1907) (1907–1976), English football forward
Jack Ball (footballer, born 1923) (1923–1999), English football goalkeeper
John Ball (footballer, born 1925) (1925–1998), English footballer for Bolton Wanderers
John Ball (soccer, born 1972), American footballer for Rochester Rhinos

Writers
John Ball (Puritan) (1585–1640), English author and scholar
John Ball (pioneer) (1794–1884), American explorer
John Ball (geologist) (1872–1941), English geologist 
John Ball (novelist) (1911–1988), American novelist
Sir John M. Ball (born 1948), English mathematician 
John Ball (cognitive scientist) (born 1963), American cognitive scientist

See also
John Bull (disambiguation)
John Ball Primary School, primary school in Blackheath, London